William Vandermuelen Wild (4 October 1834 – 25 May 1861) was an Australian politician.

He was born in Camden to Emmeline Gaudry (Godfrey) and John Benton Wild then pastoralist, later elected a member of the New South Wales Legislative Assembly from 1845 until 1848. On 26 January 1855 he married Eliza Jane Green, with whom he had three sons. A barrister from 1858, he was elected to the New South Wales Legislative Assembly for West Camden in 1858. Re-elected for Camden in 1859, he did not run in 1860. Wild died in Sydney in 1861.

References

 

1834 births
1861 deaths
Members of the New South Wales Legislative Assembly
19th-century Australian politicians